Duke William Augustus of Brunswick-Lüneburg-Harburg (15 March 1564 in Harburg – 30 March 1642 in Harburg) was Duke of Brunswick-Lüneburg-Harburg.

Life 
William Augustus was a son of Duke Otto II of Brunswick-Harburg (1528-1603) from his second marriage with Hedwig (1535-1616), the daughter of the Count Enno II of East Frisia.

William Augustus was regarded as extremely learned and, like his father, as a follower of the Lutheran doctrine.  In 1575, he became rector of the University of Rostock.  He later continued his studies at the University of Leipzig.  In 1582, he undertook a Grand Tour to France and England and then enrolled with his brothers at the University of Helmstedt.  In 1594, he again went on a journey that took him through Germany, Poland, Switzerland, Italy, Holland, Denmark and Livonia.  William Augustus kept a journal about his travels.

After the death of his father, he took up the government of Harburg jointly with his brothers Christopher and Otto III.  After they died, he ruled alone.

In 1618, William Augustus began the construction of the palace at Moisburg.  After the death of the Duke Frederick Ulrich of Brunswick-Wolfenbüttel, he received the County of Hoya from his inheritance.  August Wilhelm died unmarried and childless.  His inheritance was divided by Dukes of Frederick IV of Brunswick-Celle and Augustus II of Brunswick-Wolfenbüttel.

Ancestors

References 
 August B. Michaelis, Julius Wilhelm Hamberger: Einleitung zu einer volständigen Geschichte der Chur- und Fürstlichen Häuser in Teutschland, Meyer, 1759, vol. 1, p. 121
 Vaterländisches Archiv für hannoverisch-braunschweigische Geschichte, Herold & Wahlstab, 1835, p. 243 ff, Online

Princes of Lüneburg
1564 births
1642 deaths
People from Harburg (district)
16th-century German people
17th-century German people
Middle House of Lüneburg